Luxtera Inc., a subsidiary of Cisco Systems, is a semiconductor company that uses silicon photonics technology to build complex electro-optical systems in a production silicon CMOS process.

The company uses fabless manufacturing; it uses semiconductor fabrication plants of Freescale Semiconductor. 

The company received $130 million in funding and was acquired by Cisco Systems in 2019 for $660 million.

History
The company was founded in 2001 by a group of professors and students at California Institute of Technology including Axel Scherer, Michael Hochberg, Tom Baehr-Jones, and Eli Yablonovitch.

In 2006, the company received a $5 million contract from the Defense Advanced Research Projects Agency.

In August 2007, the company introduced Blazar, a 40GB optical active cable for interconnect within high performance computer clusters using single-mode optical fiber.

In 2010, Luxtera was selected as one of MIT Technology Review's 50 Most Innovative Companies.

In February 2019, Cisco Systems acquired the company.

References

External links
 

2001 establishments in California
2019 mergers and acquisitions
Companies based in Carlsbad, California
Fabless semiconductor companies
Semiconductor companies of the United States
Technology companies established in 2001
Cisco Systems acquisitions